This list of scholars of ethnology contains people who contributed in some form to the discipline of ethnology, the branch of anthropology that compares and analyzes the characteristics of different peoples and the relationship between them.

See also

 Bibliography of anthropology#Sociocultural anthropology

Ethnology
Anthropology literature